Xisaishan District is a district of the city of Huangshi, Hubei, People's Republic of China. On April 19, 2012, a major reform of the district's administrative divisions was carried out. The district received the Chang'an Cup award in 2017.

External links
Official website of Xisaishan District

References

County-level divisions of Hubei
Huangshi